John Buchanan Monteith (5 December 1883 – 27 September 1918) was a Scottish professional football right back who played in the Scottish League for Queen's Park.

Personal life 
Monteith served as a gunner in the Royal Garrison Artillery during the First World War and was killed in action in Pas-de-Calais on 27 September 1918. He was buried in Quéant Communal Cemetery British Extension.

Career statistics

References 

Scottish footballers
1918 deaths
British Army personnel of World War I
British military personnel killed in World War I
Scottish Football League players
Queen's Park F.C. players
Association football fullbacks
1883 births
Royal Garrison Artillery soldiers
People from Dennistoun
Footballers from Glasgow
Military personnel from Glasgow
Burials in Hauts-de-France